Tulum is  an archaeological site of the Maya civilization in Mexico. It may also refer to:

 Tulum (municipality), a municipality in the Mexican state Quintana Roo, named after the archaeological site
 Tulum, Quintana Roo, a community in the Tulum Municipality, Quintana Roo, Mexico, near the archaeological site
 Tulum (bagpipe), a traditional musical instrument from Eastern Anatolia and the Caucasus regions
 Tulum Valley, a wine making region located within San Juan Province, Argentina
 Tulum cheese, a goat's milk cheese from Turkey

 People
 Kurban Tulum (1883–1975), Uyghur treated by the Chinese Communist Party as a symbol of unity with the Uyghurs
 Zoran Tulum (b. 1956), a fencer and fencing coach from Yugoslavia

See also
Tulun (disambiguation)